The kelanting is a traditional Indonesian snack made from cassava that has been crushed, seasoned, and subsequently fried.

References 

Indonesian cuisine